Karakaş is a village in the Baskil District of Elazığ Province in Turkey. The village is populated by Kurds of the Herdî tribe and had a population of 163 in 2021.

The hamlets of Ardıçlı, Atlılar, Güllüce, Gürlenk, İpşir, Karakaş, Karameşe and Taşlık are attached to the village.

References

Villages in Baskil District
Kurdish settlements in Elazığ Province